This is a list of Michigan State Spartans football players in the NFL Draft.

Key

Selections

Notable undrafted players
Note: No drafts held before 1920

References

Michigan State

Michigan State Spartans in the NFL Draft